The Acadians are an ethnic group descended from the French who settled in the New France colony of Acadia during the 17th and 18th centuries. Most Acadians live in the region of Acadia, as it is the region where the descendants of a few Acadians who escaped the Expulsion of the Acadians (aka The Great Upheaval / Le Grand Dérangement) re-settled. Most Acadians in Canada continue to live in majority French-speaking communities, notably those in New Brunswick where Acadians and Francophones are granted autonomy in areas such as education and health. 

Acadia was one of the 5 regions of New France. Acadia was located in what is now Eastern Canada's Maritime provinces, as well as parts of Quebec and present-day Maine to the Kennebec River. It was ethnically, geographically and administratively different from the other French colonies and the French colony of Canada. As a result, the Acadians developed a distinct history and culture. The settlers whose descendants became Acadians primarily came from the southwestern region of France, also known as Occitania, such as the rural areas of Poitou-Charentes and Aquitaine (Gascony). In some cases Acadians intermarried with Indians of the region, such as Mi'kmaq and other Wabanaki tribes, and were considered Métis people.

During the French and Indian War, (known in Canada as The Seven Years War ) British colonial officers suspected that Acadians were aligned with France, after finding some Acadians fighting alongside French troops at Fort Beauséjour. Though most Acadians remained neutral during the war, the British, together with New England legislators and militia, carried out the Great Expulsion (Le Grand Dérangement) of the Acadians between 1755 and 1764. They forcefully deported approximately 11,500 Acadians from the maritime region. Approximately one-third perished from disease and drowning. In retrospect, the result has been described as an ethnic cleansing of the Acadians from Maritime Canada.

Most Acadians were deported to various British American colonies, where many were put into forced labour or servitude. Some Acadians were deported to England, some to the Caribbean, and some to France. After being expelled to France, many Acadians were eventually recruited by the Spanish government to migrate to Luisiana (present-day Louisiana). These Acadians settled into or alongside the existing Louisiana Creole settlements, sometimes intermarrying with Creoles, and gradually developed what became known as Cajun culture. 

In time, some Acadians returned to the Maritime provinces of Canada, mainly to New Brunswick. The British prohibited them from resettling their lands and villages in what became Nova Scotia. Before the American Revolutionary War, the Crown settled Protestant European immigrants and New England Planters in former Acadian communities and farmland. After the war, it made land grants in Nova Scotia to Loyalists. British policy was to establish a majority culture of Protestant religions and to assimilate Acadians with the local populations where they resettled.

Acadians speak a variety of French called Acadian French, which has a few regional accents (for example, Chiac in the southeast of New Brunswick, or Brayon in the northwest of New Brunswick). Most can also speak English. The Louisiana Cajun descendants tend to speak English, including Cajun English, and/or Louisiana French, a relative of Acadian French from Canada.

Estimates of contemporary Acadian populations vary widely. The Canadian census of 2006 reported only 96,145 Acadians in Canada, based on self-declared ethnic identity. However the Canadian Encyclopedia estimates that there are at least 500,000 of Acadian ancestry in Canada, which would include many who declared their ethnic identity for the census as French or as Canadian.

Pre-deportation history

During the early 17th century, about 60 French families were established in Acadia. They developed friendly relations with the peoples of the Wabanaki Confederacy (particularly the regional Mi'kmaq), learning their hunting and fishing techniques developed for local conditions.  The Acadians lived mainly in the coastal regions of the Bay of Fundy; they reclaimed farming land from the sea by building dikes to control water and drain certain wetlands. Living in a contested borderland region between French Canada and the British territories on New England and the coast, the Acadians often became entangled in the conflict between the powers. Their competition in Europe played out in North America as well. Over a period of 74 years, six wars (the four French and Indian Wars, Father Rale's War, and Father Le Loutre's War) took place in Acadia and Nova Scotia, in which the Wabanaki Confederacy and some Acadians fought to keep the British from taking over the region. While France lost political control of Acadia in 1713, the Mí'kmaq did not concede land to the British. Along with  Acadians, the Mi'kmaq from time to time used military force to resist the British.  That was particularly evident in the early 1720s during Dummer's War, but hostilities were brought to a close by a treaty signed in 1726.

The British had conquered Acadia in 1710. Over the next 45 years, the Acadians refused to sign an unconditional oath of allegiance to Britain. Many were influenced by Father Jean-Louis Le Loutre, who from his arrival in 1738 until his capture in 1755, preached against the "English devils". Father Le Loutre led the Acadian people during the Acadian Exodus, as an act of defiance towards British demands and oppression. Acadians took part in various militia operations against the British and maintained vital supply lines to the French Fortress of Louisbourg and Fort Beausejour. During the French and Indian War, the British sought to neutralize any military threat posed by the Acadians and to interrupt the vital supply lines which they provided to Louisbourg by deporting Acadians from Acadia.

The British founded the town of Halifax and fortified it in 1749 in order to establish a base against the French. The Mi'kmaq resisted the increased number of British (Protestant) settlements by making numerous raids on Halifax, Dartmouth, Lawrencetown, and Lunenburg. During the French and Indian War, the Mi'kmaq assisted the Acadians in resisting the British during the Expulsion of the Acadians.

Many Acadians might have signed an unconditional oath to the British monarchy had the circumstances been better, while other Acadians would not sign because it was religious oath which denied the Catholic faith because the British Monarch was Head of the Church of England.  Acadians had numerous reasons against signing an oath of loyalty to the British Crown. The British monarch was the head of the Church of England. Acadian men feared that signing the oath would commit them to fighting against France during wartime. They also worried about whether their Mi'kmaq neighbours might perceive an oath as acknowledging the British claim to Acadia rather than that of the indigenous Mi'kmaq. Acadians believed that if they signed the oath, they might put their villages at risk of attack by the Mi'kmaq.

Geographical distribution 
Data from this section from Statistics Canada, 2021.

Provinces & territories

Deportation

In the Great Expulsion (known by French speakers as le Grand Dérangement), after the Battle of Fort Beauséjour beginning in August 1755 under Lieutenant Governor Lawrence, approximately 11,500 Acadians (three-quarters of the Acadian population in Nova Scotia) were expelled, families were separated, their lands and property confiscated, and in some cases their homes were burned. The Acadians were deported to separated locations throughout the British eastern seaboard colonies, from New England to Georgia, where many were put into forced labour or imprisoned.

After 1758, thousands were transported to France. Most of the Acadians who later went to Louisiana sailed there from France on five Spanish ships. These had been provided by the Spanish Crown, which was eager to populate their Louisiana colony with Catholic settlers who might provide farmers to supply the needs of New Orleans residents. The Spanish had hired agents to seek out the dispossessed Acadians in Brittany and kept this effort secret in order to avoid angering the French king. These new arrivals from France joined the earlier wave expelled from Acadia, and gradually their descendants developed the Cajun population (which included multiracial unions and children) and culture. They continued to be attached to French culture and language, and Catholicism.

The Spanish offered the Acadians lowlands along the Mississippi River in order to block British expansion from the east. Some would have preferred Western Louisiana, where many of their families and friends had settled. In addition, that land was more suitable to mixed crops of agriculture. Rebels among them marched to New Orleans and ousted the Spanish governor. The Spanish later sent infantry from other colonies to put down the rebellion and execute the leaders. After the rebellion in December 1769, Spanish Governor O'Reilly permitted the Acadians who had settled across the river from Natchez to resettle along the Iberville or Amite rivers closer to New Orleans.

The British conducted a second and smaller expulsion of Acadians after taking control of the north shore of what is now New Brunswick. After the fall of Quebec and defeat of the French, the British lost interest in such relocations. Many Acadians gradually returned to British North America, settling in coastal villages that were not occupied by colonists from New England. A few of the Acadians in this area had evaded the British for several years, but the brutal winter weather eventually forced them to surrender. Some returnees settled in the region of Fort Sainte-Anne, now Fredericton, but were later displaced when the Crown awarded land grants to numerous United Empire Loyalists from the Thirteen Colonies after the victory of the United States in the American Revolution. Most of the descendants of Acadian returnees now live primarily on the eastern coast of New Brunswick, Canada.

In 2003, at the request of Acadian representatives, Queen Elizabeth II, Queen of Canada issued a Royal Proclamation acknowledging the deportation. She established 28 July as an annual day of commemoration, beginning in 2005. The day is called the "Great Upheaval" on some English-language calendars.

Geography

The Acadians today live predominantly in the Canadian Maritime provinces (New Brunswick, Prince Edward Island and Nova Scotia), as well as parts of Quebec, Canada, and in Louisiana and Maine, United States.

In New Brunswick, Acadians inhabit the northern and eastern shores of New Brunswick. Other groups of Acadians can be found in the Magdalen Islands and the Gaspé Peninsula. Ethnic Acadian descendants still live in and around the area of Madawaska, Maine, where some of the Acadians first landed and settled in what is now known as the St. John Valley. There are also Acadians in Prince Edward Island and Nova Scotia, at Chéticamp, Isle Madame, and Clare. East and West Pubnico, located at the end of the province, are the oldest regions that are predominantly ethnic Acadian.

Other ethnic Acadians can be found in the southern regions of New Brunswick, Western Newfoundland and in New England. Many of these communities have assimilated to varying degrees into the majority culture of English speakers. For many families in predominantly Anglophone communities, French-language attrition has occurred, particularly in younger generations.

The Acadians who settled in Louisiana after 1764 became known as Cajuns for the culture they developed. They have had a dominant cultural influence in many parishes, particularly in the southwestern area of the state, which is known as Acadiana.

Culture

Acadians are a vibrant minority, particularly in New Brunswick and Nova Scotia, Canada, and in Louisiana (Cajuns) and northern Maine, United States. Since 1994, Le Congrès Mondial Acadien has worked as an organization to unite these disparate communities and help preserve the culture.

In 1881, Acadians at the First Acadian National Convention, held in Memramcook, New Brunswick, designated 15 August, the Christian feast of the Assumption of Mary, as the national feast day of their community. On that day, the Acadians celebrate by having a tintamarre, a big parade and procession for which people dress up with the colors of Acadia and make a lot of noise and music. The national anthem of the Acadians is "Ave Maris Stella", adopted in 1884 at Miscouche, Prince Edward Island. The anthem was revised at the 1992 meeting of the Société Nationale de l'Acadie. The second, third and fourth verses were translated into French, with the first and last kept in the original Latin.

The Federation des Associations de Familles Acadiennes of New Brunswick and the Société Saint-Thomas d'Aquin of Prince Edward Island have resolved to commemorate 13 December annually as "Acadian Remembrance Day," in memory of the sinking of the Duke William and of the nearly 2,000 Acadians deported from Ile-Saint Jean who died in 1758 while being deported across the North Atlantic: from hunger, disease and drowning. The event has been commemorated annually since 2004; participants mark the day by wearing a black star.

Legacy

American writer Henry Wadsworth Longfellow published Evangeline, an epic poem loosely based on the 1755 deportation. The poem became an American classic. Activists used it as a catalyst in reviving a distinct Acadian identity in both Maritime Canada and in Louisiana. Antonine Maillet's novel Pélagie-la-charette concerns the return voyage to Acadia of several deported families, starting 15 years after the Great Expulsion. In 1976, the Canadian-American rock group The Band released the song Acadian Driftwood, influenced by Longfellow's poem.

In the early 20th century, two statues were made of the fictional figure of "Evangeline" to commemorate the Expulsion: one was installed in St. Martinville, Louisiana and the other in Grand-Pré, Nova Scotia. The Acadian Memorial (Monument Acadien) has an eternal flame; it honors the 3,000 Acadians who settled in Louisiana after the Expulsion. Monuments to the Acadian Expulsion have been erected at several sites in the Maritime Provinces, such as at Georges Island, Nova Scotia, and at Beaubears Island.

Flags 

The flag of the Acadians is the French tricolour, with the addition of a golden star in the blue field. This symbolizes Saint Mary, Our Lady of the Assumption, patron saint of the Acadians and widely known as the "Star of the Sea". This flag was adopted in 1884 at the Second Acadian National Convention, held in Miscouche, Prince Edward Island.

Acadians in the diaspora have adopted other symbols. The flag of Acadians in Louisiana, known as Cajuns, was designed by Thomas J. Arceneaux of the University of Louisiana at Lafayette. In 1974 it was adopted by the Louisiana legislature as the official emblem of the Acadiana region. The state has supported the culture, in part because it has attracted cultural and heritage tourism.

In 2004 New England Acadians, who were attending Le Congrès Mondial Acadien in Nova Scotia, endorsed a design by William Cork for a New England Acadian flag.

Prominent Acadians

 Noël Doiron (1684–1758). A regional leader, Noel was among the more than 350 Acadians who died during the deportation when the Duke William sank on 13 December 1758. He was widely celebrated and places have been named for him in Nova Scotia.
 Jean Baptiste Guedry (d. 1726).  An example of an Acadian who resisted British rule.  He took over a small ship off Acadia and was tried for piracy. The trial was publicized to the Mi’kmaq tribes as an example of English law.  Guedry's trial was used as a counter to local customs, which allowed the holding of a group - i.e., all Englishmen - responsible for an individual’s crimes.  His prosecutors also used his trial as a test case for separating English law as applied to Acadia from law applied to First Nations groups like the Wabanaki Confederacy.
 Joseph Broussard, an Acadian folk hero and militia leader who joined French priest Jean-Louis Le Loutre in resisting the British occupation of Acadia.

Contemporary Canadian figures
 Angèle Arsenault, singer
 Aubin-Edmond Arsenault, the first Acadian premier of any province and the first Acadian appointed to a provincial supreme court
 Joseph-Octave Arsenault, the first Acadian appointed to the Canadian Senate from Prince Edward Island
Jean Paul Bourque (known by the stage name Johnny Burke), singer/songwriter
 Édith Butler, singer
 Phil Comeau, film director
 Julie Doiron, singer/songwriter
 Lyse Doucet, BBC journalist and presenter
 Yvon Durelle, boxer
 Jacques LeBlanc, boxer
 Roméo LeBlanc, former Governor General of Canada
 Antonine Maillet, writer, first non-European recipient of the Prix Goncourt
 Robert Maillet, actor and former professional wrestler
 Louis Robichaud, former New Brunswick premier, modernized education and the government of New Brunswick in the mid-20th century.
 Jackie Vautour, activist
 Peter John Veniot, first Acadian to serve as Premier of New Brunswick

Figures in the U.S.
 William Arceneaux, Louisiana historian and president of the Council for the Development of French in Louisiana
 Dustin Poirier, UFC fighter of Acadian descent from Louisiana
 Kathleen Blanco, first female governor of Louisiana
 Dudley J. LeBlanc, senator from Louisiana
 Phoebe Legere, artist
 Austin Theriault, stock car driver
 Zachary Richard, singer/songwriter from Louisiana
 George Rodrigue, Artist

See also

 History of Nova Scotia
 Military history of Nova Scotia
 Acadian cuisine
 Occitans
 Occitania
 Louisiana Creoles
 Aquitani
 Chiac
 Iberians

Citations

References
  
 
 
 .

Further reading
 Chetro-Szivos, J. Talking Acadian: Work, Communication, and Culture, YBK 2006, New York .
 Griffiths, Naomi. From Migrant to Acadian: a North American border people, 1604–1755, Montreal: McGill-Queen's University Press, 2005.
 Hodson, Christopher. The Acadian Diaspora: An Eighteenth-Century History (Oxford University Press; 2012) 260 pages online review by Kenneth Banks
 Jobb, Dean. The Acadians: A People's Story of Exile and Triumph, John Wiley & Sons, 2005 (published in the United States as The Cajuns: A People's Story of Exile and Triumph)
 Kennedy, Gregory M.W. Something of a Peasant Paradise? Comparing Rural Societies in Acadie and the Loudunais, 1604-1755 (MQUP 2014)
 Laxer, James. The Acadians: In Search of a Homeland, Doubleday Canada, October 2006 .
 Le Bouthillier, Claude, Phantom Ship, XYZ editors, 1994, 
 Magord, André, The Quest for Autonomy in Acadia (Bruxelles etc., Peter Lang, 2008) (Études Canadiennes - Canadian Studies 18).

External links

 Thematic project on the Acadians at the Dictionary of Canadian Biography
 1755: The History and the Stories
 Acadian-Cajun History & Genealogy – Acadian-Cajun culture, history, & genealogy.
 Musee acadien and Research Centre of West Pubnico
 Jean Pitre circa 1635
http://www.acadians.org/ New-Brunswick and Nova Scotial Acadian Portal 
 Acadians of Madawaska, Maine
 Quit rents paid by Acadians (1743–53)

 
Acadian communities
Ethnic groups in Canada
French dialects
New France
French-Canadian people
French-speaking ethnicities in Canada